This list comprises all players who have participated in at least one league match for the Atlanta United FC since the team's first Major League Soccer season in 2017. Players who were on the roster but never appeared in a regular season game are not listed.

Players

Goalkeepers

References

 
Atlanta United FC
Association football player non-biographical articles
Atlanta United FC players
Atlanta United FC players